The Route is a Spanish television series created by Borja Soler and Roberto Martín Maiztegui for Atresplayer Premium which stars Àlex Monner, Claudia Salas, Ricardo Gómez, Elisabet Casanovas and Guillem Barbosa.

Plot 
Featuring the backdrop of the  clubbing movement, the fiction, following a group of friends "intensely living" the aforementioned cultural scene, starts in 1993 (when the massified "route" was declining), going backwards in time down to 1981.

Cast

Production 
Consisting of 8 episodes, the series was directed by Borja Soler (episodes 1, 2, 3 and 8),  (4 and 5) and Carlos Marqués-Marcet (6 and 7). Shooting began in late January 2022 in the Valencia region, and had already wrapped by late May 2022.

Release 
The series premiered on Atresplayer Premium on 13 November 2022.

Accolades 

|-
| rowspan = "7" align = "center" | 2023 || rowspan = "6" | 10th Feroz Awards || colspan = "2" | Best Drama Series ||  || rowspan = "6" | 
|-
| Best Actress in a TV Series || Claudia Salas || 
|-
| Best Actor in a TV Series || Àlex Monner || 
|-
| Best Supporting Actress in a TV Series || Elisabet Casanovas || 
|-
| Best Supporting Actor in a TV Series || Ricardo Gómez || 
|-
| Best Screenplay in a TV Series || Borja Soler, Roberto Martín Maiztegui, Clara Botas, Silvia Herreros de Tejada || 
|-
| 31st Actors and Actresses Union Awards || Best Television Actor in a Secondary Role || Ricardo Gómez ||  || 
|}

References 

Television shows filmed in Spain
Television series set in the 1980s
Television series set in the 1990s
Television shows set in the Valencian Community
Atresplayer Premium original programming
2022 Spanish television series debuts
2020s Spanish drama television series